Neil Bhoopalam is an Indian television, stage, and film actor. He is known for his roles in films such as No One Killed Jessica, Shaitan, NH10, Lust Stories, Ungli and the Indian TV series 24.

Career 
Bhoopalam started his Bollywood career with the film Mera Dil Leke Dekho although he is primarily a stage actor. He has acted in several prominent plays such as Nadir Khan's A Few Good Men and Hamlet — The Clown Prince by Rajat Kapoor.

Personal life 
Bhoopalam is married to Nandini Shrikent, a casting director in Bollywood. They have a son named Fateh.

Filmography

Films

Television

References

External links
 

Indian male film actors
Living people
21st-century Indian male actors
1983 births
Indian male stage actors
Indian male television actors